Don't Knock the Twist is a 1962 comedy musical film starring Lang Jeffries, directed by Oscar Rudolph and produced by Sam Katzman for release by Columbia Pictures. It is a sequel to the 1961 film Twist Around the Clock, featuring musical artists including Chubby Checker.

Plot summary
A large group of twist dancers meet in preparation for a television variety show called The Twist. While the program is still in its production stages, jealousy leads to problems.

Cast
 Chubby Checker as Chubby Checker
 Gene Chandler as the Duke of Earl
 Vic Dana as Vic Dana
 Linda Scott as Linda Scott
 The Dovells as the Dovells
 Len Barry as Len Barry (of the Dovells)
 Mike Dennis as Mike Dennis (of the Dovells)
 Arnie Satin as Arnie Satin (of the Dovells)
 Jerry Summers as Jerry Summers (of the Dovells)
 The Carroll Brothers as the Carroll Brothers
 Lang Jeffries as Ted Haver
 Mari Blanchard as Dulcie Corbin
 Georgine Darcy as Madge Albright
 Stephen Preston as Billy Albright

Music

Live performances in the film 
 "Don't Knock the Twist" - Chubby Checker
 "Duke of Earl" - Gene Chandler
 "Slow Twistin'" - Chubby Checker & Dee Dee Sharp
 "Yessiree" - Linda Scott
 "Little Altar Boy" - Vic Dana
 "The Fly" - Chubby Checker
 "Do the New Continental" - The Dovells
 "Hey! Bo Diddley" - The Carroll Brothers
 "Mashed Potato Time" - Dee Dee Sharp
 "Bristol Stomp" - The Dovells

Soundtrack 
 "Twistin'" (Mann-Appell) 2:08
 "Bristol Stomp" (Mann-Appell) 2:18
 "La Paloma Twist" (Kal Mann) 2:32
 "Mashed Potato Time" (Sheldon-Land) 2:27
 "Bo Diddley" (Bo Diddley) 3:05 (misspelled "Diddely" on cover and label)
 "I Love to Twist" (Mann-Lowe) 2:40
 "Don't Knock the Twist" (Mann-Appell) 2:17
 "Salome Twist" (Karger-Kent) 1:38
 "The Fly" (John Madara/David White) 2:27
 "Smashed Potatoes" (Sheldon-Leon) 2:27
 "Slow Twistin'" (Jon Sheldon) 2:31

References

External links
 
 
 
 
 Don't Knock The Twist at Turner Classic Movies

1962 musical comedy films
1962 films
American black-and-white films
1962 romantic comedy films
American musical comedy films
Twist (dance)
Columbia Pictures films
1960s romantic musical films
1960s English-language films
1960s American films